John Francis Barnes also known as Frank Barnes (4 October 1904 – 12 May 1952) was a politician in Queensland, Australia. He was a Member of the Queensland Legislative Assembly.

Early life 
John Francis Barnes was born on  4 October 1904 in Gympie, Queensland, the son of George Daniel (a miner) and his wife Bridget Maria (née Gorey).

Politics 
Barnes held the Legislative Assembly of Queensland seat for the electoral district of Bundaberg from 1941 to 1950. During this time he stood as an "Andrew Fisher Labour" and a "Frank Barnes Labour" candidate. His brother Lou Barnes was also a "Frank Barnes Labor" member of the Queensland Parliament, representing the seat of Cairns from 1942 to 1947.

Frank Barnes was a colourful identity who supported social credit theories, which had been popular since the Great Depression, and was opposed to the Queensland Labor government.

Later life 
Barnes died in Bundaberg on 12 May 1952 and was buried in the Bundaberg General Cemetery.

References

External links

1904 births
1952 deaths
Members of the Queensland Legislative Assembly
Australian social crediters
20th-century Australian politicians
People from Gympie